"White Reflection" is the sixth single by J-pop duo Two-Mix, released by King Records on January 15, 1997. Composed by the duo of Shiina Nagano and Minami Takayama, the song was used as the ending theme of the anime OVA series Gundam Wing: Endless Waltz.

The single peaked at No. 6 on Oricon's weekly singles chart. It sold over 156,000 copies and was certified Gold by the RIAJ.

Music video
The music video featuring anime versions of Nagano and Takayama was included in QuickTime format on the bonus CD-ROM of the duo's 1997 compilation album BPM "Best Files". It was directed by Kazuya Murata and animated by OLM, Inc., with character designs by Yuriko Chiba. The video was re-released in the 2001 DVD White Reflection: The Movie. It was remastered in high definition and included on Blu-ray in the limited edition release of the 2021 compilation album Two-Mix 25th Anniversary All Time Best.

Track listing
All lyrics are written by Shiina Nagano. All music is composed by Minami Takayama. All music is arranged by Two-Mix.

Chart position

Certification

Other versions 
Remixes of the song were released on the albums Fantastix, BPM "Dance Unlimited", and Dream Tactix.

Cover versions 
 Yoko Ishida covered the song on the 2001 various artists album Ultra Anime Eurobeat Series Mega Max.
 Ai Tokunaga covered the song on her 2004 album Scarlet.
 Hikaru Midorikawa, who voiced Heero Yuy in Gundam Wing, covered the song on the 2022 various artists album Two-Mix Tribute Album "Crysta-Rhythm".

References

External links 
 
 

1997 singles
1997 songs
Two-Mix songs
Gundam songs
Mobile Suit Gundam Wing
Japanese-language songs
King Records (Japan) singles
Songs written by Minami Takayama